Cannabinoidergic, or cannabinergic, means "working on the endocannabinoid neurotransmitters". As with terms such as  dopaminergic and serotonergic, related proteins and cellular components involved endocannabinoid signaling, such as the cannabinoid (CB1) receptor, as well as exogenous compounds, such as phytocannabinoids or other cannabinoids which modulate the activity of endocannabinoid system, can be described as cannabinoidergic.

See also
 Adenosinergic
 Adrenergic
 Cholinergic
 Dopaminergic
 GABAergic
 Glycinergic
 Histaminergic
 Melatonergic
 Monoaminergic
 Opioidergic
 Serotonergic

References

Cannabinoids
Neurochemistry